Thomas Brinsmead Williams (18 June 1884 – 12 January 1954) was a Welsh cricketer.  Williams' batting and bowling styles are unknown.  He was born in Newport, Monmouthshire.

Williams made his debut for Monmouthshire in the 1904 Minor Counties Championship against Glamorgan.  He played Minor counties cricket for the county from 1904 to 1934, making 115 appearances.  After the 1934 season, Monmouthshire no longer entered a team in the Minor Counties Championship.  During his career he played a single first-class match for Wales against Ireland.  In this match he batted once, scoring 43 runs in the Welsh first-innings before being dismissed by Gustavus Kelly.

He died in Llandaff, Glamorgan on 12 January 1954.

References

External links
Thomas Williams at ESPNcricinfo
Thomas Williams at CricketArchive

1884 births
1954 deaths
Sportspeople from Newport, Wales
Welsh cricketers
Monmouthshire cricketers
Wales cricketers